The Howard Johnson Invitational was a golf tournament on the LPGA Tour, played only in 1959. It was played at the Mid Pines Golf Club in Southern Pines, North Carolina. Joyce Ziske won the event.

References

Former LPGA Tour events
Golf in North Carolina
Women's sports in North Carolina